Kappa Delta Pi International Honor Society in Education, is an honor society for education. It was founded in 1911 and was one of the first discipline-specific honor societies.  Its membership is limited to the top 20 percent of those entering the field of education.

Membership
Membership is open only to the top 20 percent of those entering the education field.  In addition, undergraduates must have a 3.0 GPA, and graduate students a 3.50 GPA.  Membership for active professionals varies.

Among those involved as Professional Members are superintendents and principals; early childhood, elementary, middle, and secondary school teachers; Professional School Counselors; university faculty and deans; graduate and doctoral students; nontraditional educators; retired educators; State Teachers of the Year; researchers; and other education specialists.

Individuals must maintain active membership each year through payment of dues to continue to receive benefits.  Though direct involvement with a chapter is optional, members also may join community-based networking groups via KDP Global to extend their support system and mentoring community.

History
Kappa Delta Pi was founded in 1911 at the University of Illinois in order to foster excellence in education and promote fellowship among those dedicated to teaching.  In 1912, a petition to merge Kappa Delta Pi and Phi Delta Kappa (PDK) was declined by the latter because PDK could not agree to the terms that women be allowed in an "honor fraternity".  In 1920, William Chandler Bagley installed a Kappa Delta Pi chapter at Teachers College, Columbia University.  Four years later (1924) American pragmatist philosopher and educationalist John Dewey was inducted as the first member of the Society's Laureate Chapter (see below).  The Society's flagship publication, The Educational Forum, was first published in 1936.

Organization and governance

Organization
Among the more than 625 chapters around the world are institutional chapters affiliated with teacher education programs, including community colleges and virtual universities. Led by students and faculty, these chapters provide local members with networking, leadership, service, and professional development programming.  In addition to individual programs and events provided through individual chapters, all members can participate in professional development located on the Kappa Delta Pi website, which includes webinars 
and KDP Global. 

Alumni/professional chapters and affiliate chapters, organized in school districts or cities, offer members opportunities to participate in educational and service activities and to grow through professional development.

The Society headquarters is responsible for the daily operations of the Society. The headquarters staff maintains membership and financial records, and provides support and assistance to institutional, alumni/professional, and affiliate chapters and members. Headquarters offices are located in Indianapolis, Indiana.

The Kappa Delta Pi Educational Foundation solicits contributions to fund educational programs for the Society and its members. Since 1980, the Foundation has awarded more than $1 million for programs, grants, and scholarships. Members of KDP serve as Kappa Delta Pi Educational Foundation trustees to oversee policies and governance.

Governance
The Society is led by the Executive Council, which consists of nine elected members who are responsible for the vision, direction, fiscal security, and general oversight of the association. The Executive Council also appoints chairs and members of national committees. Biennially, the legislative body of the Society convenes to determine policy for the organization, including changes to the bylaws. Voting delegates elected by chapters represent their local voice and opinions at the Convocation.

Publications
The Teacher Advocate, published quarterly, offers novice and apprentice teachers connections and support through practice-oriented articles and expert-advice columns.

The Kappa Delta Pi Record, published quarterly, presents practical articles on compelling topics and issues important to practicing educators who teach at all levels and in a wide range of disciplines in classrooms and other educational settings.

The Educational Forum is a doubly masked, peer-reviewed journal that is published quarterly.

Notable members/Laureates
The Laureate Chapter was established in 1924 to honor individuals who have made contributions to the development of professional education. It is limited to 60 living persons.  Early members included:

John Dewey (the first nominee to the Laureate Chapter)
Albert Einstein
Margaret Mead
Eleanor Roosevelt
Jean Piaget 
George Washington Carver
Jane Addams

Other notable members of Kappa Delta Pi include:
William Chandler Bagley
Harry Samuel Broudy
James Bryant Conant
James William Fulbright
Howard Gardner
Henry A. Giroux
Maxine Greene
Robert Maynard Hutchins
William Heard Kilpatrick
Alfie Kohn
Jonathan Kozol
Nel Noddings
Michael Apple

References

Honor societies
Student organizations established in 1911
1911 establishments in Illinois
Former members of Association of College Honor Societies